Don Peppe is an Italian restaurant in South Ozone Park, Queens but was originally in Brooklyn.

Don Peppe is a half mile east of Aqueduct Racetrack and is decorated with photographs of thoroughbreds as well as jockey silks. They still have people from the track as customers but not as large as in the past.  The racing decorations date back to the 1960s when they moved to Lefferts Boulevard from Brooklyn.

Along with Bamonte's, it was one of the restaurants Anthony "Fat Tony" Rabito, a Bonanno crime family Consigliere was forbidden to frequent by his probation officer. Rabito was told to stay away from “hot places” “because they are well known mob hangouts.”

In popular culture
Entourage had a subplot with Turtle where he wanted to open a location in Los Angeles.
The Best Thing I Ever Ate Season 3 for their linguini with clam sauce

External links
U.S. v. Luca

References

Italian restaurants in New York City
Ozone Park, Queens
Italian-American organized crime